Amblyptila is a genus of moths in the family Gracillariidae.

Species
Amblyptila cynanchi Vári, 1961 
Amblyptila strophanthina Vári, 1961

External links
Global Taxonomic Database of Gracillariidae (Lepidoptera)

Acrocercopinae
Gracillarioidea genera